Musical tributes or homages from one composer to another can take many forms. Following are examples of the major types of tributes occurring in classical music. A particular work may fit into more than one of these types.

Variations

Variations on a theme by another composer. These are usually written as discrete sets of variations. There are hundreds of examples, including:
 Ludwig van Beethoven's Diabelli Variations
 Johannes Brahms's Variations on a Theme by Haydn (which theme was probably not written by Haydn at all)

Works with other titles
Many works are based on a theme or themes by another composer (sometimes anonymous or traditional). They range from short pieces to extended major compositions. Sometimes these works are no more than sets of variations under another name, but sometimes they go beyond that. They appear under many titles, including: 

 Works ending in -ana, such as:
 Pyotr Ilyich Tchaikovsky's tribute to Wolfgang Amadeus Mozart by subtitling his Orchestral Suite No. 4 Mozartiana
 Ottorino Respighi's tribute to Gioachino Rossini, titled Rossiniana
 Robert Gerhard's hommage to Felip Pedrell, titled Pedrelliana 
 Manuel de Falla's Pedrelliana, to Pedrell too, fourth part of his Hommages suite
 Joaquín Rodrigo's Soleriana (1953), on eight pieces by Antoni Soler 
 Carles Surinyach's Soleriana (1972), also on Antoni Soler 
 Fantasia or Fantasy
 Ralph Vaughan Williams's Fantasia on a Theme by Thomas Tallis
 Franz Liszt's Fantasy on Themes from Mozart's Marriage of Figaro and Don Giovanni
 Joaquín Rodrigo's Fantasía para un gentilhombre on themes from Gaspar Sanz's Instrucción de música sobre la Guitarra Española.
 Hommage
 Carlos Chávez's Estudio IV: homenaje a Chopin, for piano (1949)
 the second piece from Claude Debussy's piano suite Images is Hommage à Rameau
 Lorenzo Ferrero's Thema 44 (ad honorem J. Haydn) for small orchestra
 Manuel de Falla's Hommages for orchestra (1938–1939), four pieces devoted to Enrique Fernández Arbós, Claude Debussy, Paul Dukas and Felip Pedrell.
 Robert Gerhard's Symphony Hommage to Pedrell
 Edvard Grieg's Study (Hommage à Chopin), from Moods, Op. 73
 György Kurtág
...a Százévesnek – Hommage à Takács Jenő, for small string orchestra (2002)
Hommage à András Mihály, Op. 13, for string quartet (1977–78)
Hommage à Jacob Obrecht, for string quartet (2004–2005)
Hommage à R. Sch., for clarinet (and bass drum), viola, and piano (1990)
Looking Back: Old and New for Four Players, Hommage à Stockhausen, for trumpet, double-bass, and keyboard instruments (1993)
Négy initium az Hommage à Jacob Obrecht-ből, for viola and cello (2005)
Petite musique solennelle – En hommage à Pierre Boulez 90, for orchestra (2015)
 Alexandre Tansman's Hommage à Chopin (for guitar)
 Heitor Villa-Lobos's Hommage à Chopin for piano solo
 Paraphrase
 Liszt's Paraphrase on the "Dies Irae", which he called Totentanz
 Rhapsody
Sergei Rachmaninoff's Rhapsody on a Theme of Paganini (probably the most famous of the many works based on Niccolò Paganini's Caprice No. 24 in A minor for solo violin)
 Reminiscences
 Liszt's Réminiscences de Don Juan (based on themes from Mozart's opera Don Giovanni)
 Tombeau
 Maurice Ravel's Le tombeau de Couperin
 Manuel de Falla's Le Tombeau de Debussy
 Arthur Benjamin's Le Tombeau de Ravel

Use of composer's name or an associated name
Examples of the use of a composer's name as the title of a work include:
 Nicolas Isouard's opera Cimarosa (1808), after the eponymous composer
 Albert Lortzing's singspiel Szenen aus Mozarts Leben (1832), on Mozart's life
 Robert Schumann named two sections of his piano work Carnaval after Paganini and Chopin
 Alessandro Stradella's life was the basis for some operas with the title Stradella by Louis Niedermeyer (1837), César Franck (1841) and Friedrich von Flotow's Alessandro Stradella (1844)
 Emilio Arrieta's opera Pergolesi (1851), after this composer
 Johann Joseph Abert's opera Astorga (1866), a fictional work based on Emanuele d'Astorga's life
 Joachim Raff's opera Benedetto Marcello (1878, after the eponymous composer)
 Nikolai Rimsky-Korsakov's opera Mozart and Salieri (1897) was based on fictional events supposedly involving Mozart and Antonio Salieri
 Stanislao Falchi's opera Tartini. o Il trillo del Diavolo (1899), about Giuseppe Tartini
 Giacomo Orefice's opera Chopin (1901), a fictional treatment of the life of Frédéric Chopin, in which the arias were based on themes from that composer's piano works
 Hans Pfitzner's opera Palestrina (1917), depicting episodes in the life of Giovanni Pierluigi da Palestrina
 Franz Lehár's operetta Paganini (1925), a fictional treatment of Paganini's life
 Bernhard Paumgartner's opera Rossini in Neapel (1936) on Gioacchino Rossini
 Sir Peter Maxwell Davies's opera Taverner (1972), on John Taverner's life
 Alfred Schnittke's opera Gesualdo (1995), based on Carlo Gesualdo's life.

Sometimes the name of something strongly associated with the composer is used as the title of a work:
 Sergei Lyapunov named a symphonic poem written in tribute to Chopin after that composer's birthplace Żelazowa Wola
 Emil Ábrányi's opera A Tamás-templom karnagya (The cantor of Saint Thomas) (1947), on Johann Sebastian Bach, referring to him by the church where he worked.

Transcription or adaptation

Transcriptions or adaptations of existing works for other forces, such as:
 Maurice Ravel's orchestration of Modest Mussorgsky's piano work Pictures at an Exhibition
 Franz Liszt's transcription for solo piano or two pianos of the nine symphonies of Beethoven
 Robert Wright and George Forrest's arrangements of the works of classical composers as songs for musicals (the best known are Kismet, based on Alexander Borodin; and Song of Norway, based on Grieg)

Quotation

Quotation of a theme or themes by another composer. Many examples, including:
 Richard Strauss quoted the funeral march from Beethoven's Eroica Symphony (No. 3) in his Metamorphosen for 23 solo strings
 Igor Stravinsky quoted a theme from Franz Schubert's Marche Militaire No. 1 in D in his Circus Polka

Transformation

Transformation of completed works, such as: 
 Charles Gounod took the melody line from Bach's Prelude No. 1 in C major from Book I of The Well-Tempered Clavier, and added his own harmonies, setting it to the words of the prayer Hail Mary (in Latin, Ave Maria). His setting was called Ave Maria
 Grieg added an additional part for a second piano to existing solo piano sonatas by Mozart

Synthesis
Synthesis of fragmentary notes into a conjectural whole, such as: 
 Luciano Berio's Rendering (1989) embeds fragments of an unfinished symphony by Franz Schubert
 Anthony Payne's elaboration of Edward Elgar's notes for his Third Symphony (which he does not pretend is necessarily what Elgar would have written had he had the opportunity)
 Charles Wuorinen's A Reliquary for Igor Stravinsky (1975) incorporates sketch fragments by Igor Stravinsky

Completion

Completion of substantially written but unfinished works, such as:
 Franz Xaver Süssmayr completing Mozart's Requiem in accordance with the outline sketched by the composer
 Franco Alfano completing Giacomo Puccini's opera Turandot
 Deryck Cooke's completion of Gustav Mahler's Tenth Symphony

Imitation

Imitation, where a composer deliberately copies the compositional style of an earlier composer, such as:
 Siegfried Ochs wrote a set of 14 Humorous Variations on the German Volkslied "Kommt ein Vogel geflogen", in which each variation was in the style of a different composer (they included Bach, Haydn, Mozart, Beethoven and Wagner)
 Sergei Prokofiev imitated Joseph Haydn in his Symphony No. 1 in D Classical
 Maurice Ravel composed two piano pieces in 1913, titled A la manière de … Borodine, and A la manière de … Chabrier
 Heitor Villa-Lobos wrote a series of works called Bachianas Brasileiras, imitating the style of Bach
 Tchaikovsky wrote imitative piano pieces called Un poco di Schumann and Un poco di Chopin in his 18 Morceaux, Op. 72; also his Album des enfants, Op. 39, was subtitled 24 Children's Pieces à la Schumann

Dedication
Dedication of a work to another composer or performer:
 Pierre Boulez's Rituel in memoriam Bruno Maderna
 Anton Bruckner's Symphony No. 3 is dedicated to Richard Wagner
 George Enescu's Octet for strings, Op. 7 (1900), is dedicated to André Gedalge
 York Höller
Mythos (1979–80) is dedicated to Hans Zender
Schwarze Halbinseln (1982) is dedicated to Karlheinz Stockhausen
Topic (1967) is dedicated to Bernd Alois Zimmermann
 The Messa per Rossini, a collaborative work by 13 composers spearheaded by Giuseppe Verdi, in a tribute to Rossini
 Aram Khachaturian's Violin Concerto is dedicated to David Oistrakh
 Witold Lutosławski's Musique funèbre "à la mémoire de Béla Bartók"
 Arvo Pärt's Cantus in Memoriam Benjamin Britten
 Wolfgang Rihm's Sub-Kontur (1974–75) is dedicated to Karlheinz Stockhausen
 Karlheinz Stockhausen
 Gruppen for three orchestras, Nr. 6 (1955–57) is dedicated to Herbert Eimert
 The four Regions of Hymnen are dedicated to Pierre Boulez, Henri Pousseur, John Cage, and Luciano Berio
 The reduced-orchestra version of Mixtur, Nr. 16½ (1967) is dedicated to Ladislav Kupkovič
 Spiral, Nr. 29 (1969) is dedicated to the six singers of the Collegium Vocale Köln (Dagmar Apel, Gaby Rodens, Helga Albrecht, Wolfgang Fromme, Siegfried Bernhöft, and Hans Alderich Billig), and David C. Johnson, Michael Vetter, Edward Tarr, Karlheinz Böttner, Christoph Caskel, Michael Ranta, Rolf Gehlhaar, Peter Eötvös, Gérard Frémy, Aloys Kontarsky, Johannes Fritsch, and Mesías Maiguashca
 Igor Stravinsky's Symphonies of Wind Instruments (1920) is dedicated to the memory of Claude Debussy
 Ralph Vaughan Williams' Symphony No. 5 is dedicated to Jean Sibelius.

Cryptogram

Musical cryptograms, where the composer’s name is encoded in musical letters. The most famous example of this is the BACH motif, which has been used by over 400 composers in tribute to Johann Sebastian Bach (Bach himself used it more than once in his own works). Other examples include:
 Ravel's Menuet sur le nom d'Haydn
 Arnold Bax's Variations on the name Gabriel Fauré for harp and strings
 the DSCH motif, depicting Dmitri Shostakovich; it has been used by various other composers in tribute to him.

References

Musical terminology
Classical music lists
 
 
Musical tributes